Suea Sung Fah (lit: "The Tiger Commands the Heaven") a.k.a. Legend of the Tiger is Thai TV series or lakorn aired on Thailand's Channel 7 from August 25 to October 27, 2011 on Wednesdays and Thursdays at 20:30 for 19 episodes.

The word "Suea" (เสือ) in Thai means "panther" or "tiger" or implied meaning may people with courageous minds or bandit.

Synopsis
In 1957, Thailand, after World War II gangsters abound. The gangsters clashed with the police with various deadly weapons and black magic spells.

Cast

Rating
When it was released, it was very popular. Especially in the finale, the ratings reached , the highest in 2011, and ranked # 1 throughout the 9 weeks of the broadcast, also voted as the 8th best TV series of the year from the Pantip.com

References

2011 Thai television series debuts
2011 Thai television series endings
Thai action television series
Fantasy television series
Television series set in the 1950s
Channel 7 (Thailand) original programming